Dieter Fensel (born 10 October 1960, in Nuremberg) is a German researcher in the field of formal languages and the semantic web. He is University Professor at the University of Innsbruck, where he directs the Semantic Technologies Institute Innsbruck (STI Innsbruck), a research center associated with the university.

Biography 
Fensel studied mathematics, social science and computer science at Berlin, and received his doctorate in economics in 1993, studying under Dr Rudi Studer at the University of Karlsruhe.  (Title: Die Wissen-Erfassungs- und Repräsentationssprache KARL).  In 1998 he received his habilitation and started work at the Institute for Applied Computer Science and Formal Description Procedures (AIFB), focusing, inter alia, on knowledge management and Formal languages.

Subsequently he worked as an assistant professor at University of Amsterdam, and as a professor at NUI Galway (Ireland) (2003–2006) and at the University of Innsbruck. He was hired by NUI Galway to direct the Digital Enterprise Research Institute (DERI); he resigned this position after a dispute with Science Foundation Ireland over whether he could be reimbursed for chartered aircraft, used to simplify the otherwise-complicated travel connections between Galway and Innsbruck. Since 2003 he has also been the director of DERI Innsbruck, which in December 2007 was renamed to Semantic Technologies Institute Innsbruck (STI Innsbruck). Fensel was the founding director of the Semantic Technology Institute International (STI2). He is one of five founders of seekda spin-off company of STI Innsbruck.

Fensel has published numerous articles in technical periodicals, has been giving keynote speeches  and co-organized conferences. He has been and is involved in several national and international research projects such as LarKc, SOA4All and Insemtives.

Bibliography 
 Dieter Fensel: The Knowledge Acquisition and Representation Language KARL, Kluwer Academic Publisher, Boston, 1995
 Dieter Fensel: Problem-Solving Methods: Understanding, Development, Description, and Reuse, Lecture Notes on Artificial Intelligence (LNAI), no 1791, Springer-Verlag, Berlin, 2000
 Dieter Fensel: Ontologies: Silver Bullet for Knowledge Management and Electronic Commerce, Springer-Verlag, Berlin, 2001
 Dieter Fensel, Borys Omelayenko, Ding Ying: Intelligent Information Integration in B2B Electronic Commerce, Kluwer, 2002
 John Davies, Dieter Fensel, Christoph Bussler, Rudi Studer (Editors): Towards the Semantic Web: Ontology-Driven Knowledge Management, Wiley, 2002
 Dieter Fensel, John Davies (Editors): Spinning the Semantic Web, MIT Press, Boston, 2003
 Dieter Fensel, Katia Sycara, John Mylopoulos (Editors): The Semantic Web. ISWC 2003, Springer-Verlag, 2004
 Dieter Fensel, Umutcan Şimşek, Kevin Angele, Elwin Huaman, Elias Kärle, Oleksandra Panasiuk, Ioan Toma, Jürgen Umbrich and Alexander Wahler: Knowledge Graphs - Methodology, Tools and Selected Use Cases, Springer-Verlag, Berlin, 2020

References

External links 
 Curriculum Vitae Dieter Fensel

1960 births
Scientists from Nuremberg
Living people
German computer scientists
Academic staff of the University of Innsbruck
Semantic_Web_people